Stefan Edberg and Anders Järryd were the defending champions, but they did not participate this year.

Sergio Casal and Emilio Sánchez won the title, defeating Craig Campbell and Joey Rive, 6–4, 6–2 in the final.

Seeds
Champion seeds are indicated in bold text while text in italics indicates the round in which those seeds were eliminated.

Draw

References

External links
 1986 Swedish Open Doubles Draw

1986 Grand Prix (tennis)
Swedish Open